The name marsh tern refers to terns of the genus Chlidonias, which are typically found in freshwater marshes, rather than coastal locations.

Species
There are four species:

Notice the hesitation in the gender of the epithet of the scientific names, as they are usually masculine (albostriatus, leucopterus or niger), but in the case of the whiskered tern is mostly used as feminine (hybrida), maybe from the influence of the previous gender used, Sterna.

The black-bellied tern (Sterna acuticauda) and the white-cheeked tern (Sterna repressa) might also be placed in Chlidonias.

References

Taxa named by Constantine Samuel Rafinesque